Anna Kalinskaya and Caty McNally defeated Alicja Rosolska and Erin Routliffe in the final, 6–3, 6–7(5–7), [10–4] to win the doubles tennis title at the 2022 St. Petersburg Ladies' Trophy.

Nadiia Kichenok and Raluca Olaru were the reigning champions, but Kichenok chose not to participate. Olaru partnered Sorana Cîrstea, but lost to Anastasia Potapova and Vera Zvonareva in the second round.

Seeds

Draw

Draw

References

External links
 Main draw

2022 WTA Tour
2022 St. Petersburg Ladies' Trophy - 2